Tripterygium is a genus of plants in the family Celastraceae. Tripterygium wilfordii is used in Traditional Chinese medicine.

Selected species
 Tripterygium doianum
 Tripterygium hypoglaucum
 Tripterygium regelii
 Tripterygium wilfordii

References

Celastrales genera
Celastraceae
Taxa named by Joseph Dalton Hooker